Madina-Tul-Hijjaj Railway Station (Urdu and ) is located in Madina-Tul-Hijjaj, Rawalpindi city, Rawalpindi district of Punjab province, Pakistan.

See also
 List of railway stations in Pakistan
 Pakistan Railways

References

External links

Railway stations in Islamabad Capital Territory